Below is the list of asteroid close approaches to Earth in 2020.

Timeline of known close approaches less than one lunar distance from Earth 

A list of known near-Earth asteroid close approaches less than 1 lunar distance from Earth in 2020.

Two objects have been observed to be temporary satellites of Earth:  in February 2020 and 2020 SO in September 2020, albeit the latter has been confirmed to be a rocket booster from the Surveyor 2 mission launched in 1966.

Warning times by size 
This sub-section visualises the warning times of the close approaches listed in the above table, depending on the size of the asteroid. It shows the effectiveness of asteroid warning systems at detecting close approaches in 2021. The sizes of the charts show the relative sizes of the asteroids to scale. For comparison, the approximate size of a person is also shown. This is based the absolute magnitude of each asteroid, an approximate measure of size based on brightness.

Absolute Magnitude 30 and greater
 (size of a person for comparison)

Absolute Magnitude 29-30

Absolute Magnitude 28-29

Absolute Magnitude 27-28

Absolute Magnitude 26-27

Absolute Magnitude 25-26
 
Absolute Magnitude less than 25 (largest)

Predicted close approaches 
Below is the list of predicted close approaches of near-Earth asteroids larger than magnitude 27, that were predicted to occur in 2020. This relates to asteroid cataloging systems effectiveness at predicting close approaches in 2020.

For asteroids which were observed but not predicted, see the main list above. In 2020, at the outset of the year, no asteroids were predicted to pass within 1 lunar distance  of Earth. Table omitted.

Notes

Additional examples 

An example list of near-Earth asteroids that passed or will pass more than 1 lunar distance (384,400 km or 0.00256 AU) from Earth in 2020.

Notes

See also 
List of asteroid close approaches to Earth
List of asteroid close approaches to Earth in 2019
List of asteroid close approaches to Earth in 2021
Asteroid impact prediction

References 

close approaches to Earth in 2020
Near-Earth asteroids